The Investor Relations Society (IR Society) is the professional body for investor relations professionals in the United Kingdom.

Established in 1980, The Investor Relations Society is a non-profit making institute and has almost 600 members drawn primarily from UK listed companies, as well as overseas companies operating in the UK. Its UK members represent two-thirds of companies listed on the FTSE 100 Index.

Investor Relations activities in the UK are covered by a number of legal and regulatory requirements including the Companies Act 2006, Financial Services and Markets Act 2000 and The Criminal Justice Act 1993. The Financial Services Authority in the UK also publishes indications of best practice. The Investor Relations Society runs educational programmes to assist with the understanding of the legal and regulatory framework in the UK.

The Investor Relations Society has counterparts in many other countries including the United States, Australia and The Netherlands.

References
Ethical Corporation: 19 Apr 2003: UK Investor relations society takes issue with CSR ‘lobbyists’
 Manifest Information Services Limited - The Investor Relations Society (IRS)
Australasian Investor Relations Association (AIRA)
National Investor Relations Institute, United States
International Investor Relations Federation

External links

Organizations established in 1980
Business organisations based in the United Kingdom
Clubs and societies in the United Kingdom
1980 establishments in the United Kingdom